The International Order of Twelve Knights and Daughters of Tabor is an African-American fraternal organization best known as the sponsor of the Taborian Hospital.

It was founded as the International Order of Twelve in 1846 as an antislavery society. The Order was re-organized in 1872 as a fraternal organization in Independence, Missouri. The new leader of the group was Moses Dickson, a clergyman of the African Methodist Episcopal Church. In the 1890s the group claimed to have 100,000 members in thirty US states, the West Indies, England and Africa. Men's lodges were called "Temples" and women's lodges were "Tabernacles". There were also juvenile lodges of the order called "Tents". Male and female junior members were known as Pages of Honor and Maid, respectively.

The relationship between the Taborians and another group, the Princes and Princesses of the Royal House of Media, who met in Palatiums for social and literary purposes is unclear.

In 1915, the Order was involved in a widely publicized lawsuit in Texas. A man named Smith Johnson tripped and fell during his initiation, causing a sword to enter his body. The Order claimed that the ritual did not specify the use of a sword on the part of an officiating officer, and that the individual should be held accountable for the accident. The case went up to the Texas Supreme Court, which found in favor of the plaintiff and ordered the Order to pay him the $12,000 awarded by a lower court.

Taborian Hospital

After years of decline, membership surged after 1938, when Perry M. Smith, the Chief Grand Mentor, persuaded the Mississippi Jurisdiction of the order to build a hospital in the all-black town of Mound Bayou, Mississippi. To pay for it, each member paid an annual assessment into a hospital fund. In addition, Smith visited sharecroppers and tenants on plantations throughout Mississippi to raise funds.

Notes

References
 Beito, David T. (2000). From Mutual Aid to the Welfare State: Fraternal Societies and Social Services, 1890–1967. University of North Carolina Press. 

 
Organizations established in 1872
1872 establishments in Missouri
Mound Bayou, Mississippi